Černěves is a municipality and village in Litoměřice District in the Ústí nad Labem Region of the Czech Republic. It has about 200 inhabitants.

It is about 3 km from Roudnice nad Labem.

References

External links

Villages in Litoměřice District